Langfield Falls are a waterfall in the United States, located in Skamania County, Washington in the Gifford Pinchot National Forest. Langfield Falls was named after Karl C. Langfield, a United States Forest Service ranger.

See also
 List of waterfalls

References

External links
 YouTube video of Langfield Falls

Waterfalls of Washington (state)